Close Combat: Invasion: Normandy is a 2000 computer wargame developed by Atomic Games and published by Mattel Interactive for Windows. It is the fifth game in the Close Combat series. A remake, Close Combat: The Longest Day was released in 2009.

Gameplay
Close Combat: Invasion: Normandy is a computer wargame with real-time gameplay, which focuses on military conflict in World War II.

Development
Atomic Games began working on Close Combat: Invasion: Normandy in early 2000, following the release of the fourth Close Combat title, Close Combat: Battle of the Bulge. The previous game had been made for Mindscape's Strategic Simulations Inc. (SSI) label, and Invasion: Normandy began under that publisher. However, Mindscape had since been sold to Mattel when that company bought The Learning Company, Mindscape's parent, for $3.5 billion in 1999. As a result, Close Combat V was published by Mattel Interactive, a financially unstable company. Computer Games Magazines Robert Mayer noted in September 2000 that "the future of [Close Combat] is up in the air—Mattel Interactive is perennially on the trading block, and Atomic ... has lost some key staff members in recent months".

Late in September, Mattel sold The Learning Company at a bargain price to The Gores Group. A spokesman for the new managers announced that they expected to make it "profitable within six months." Invasion: Normandy was released in October 2000.

Reception

According to Metacritic, Close Combat: Invasion: Normandy received "generally favorable reviews" from critics.

References

External links

2000 video games
Computer wargames
Real-time tactics video games
Video games about Nazi Germany
Video games developed in the United States
Video games set in France
World War II video games
Windows games
Windows-only games
Atomic Games games